Boyce Thompson, Jr. (born October 1, 1955) is an American author and magazine editor. His work includes three published architecture books. A fourth architecture book, The Forever Home (Schiffer), and his first history book, Lincoln’s Lost Colony (McFarland), are scheduled for publication in 2023.

Thompson is the founding editor of Residential Architect, Big Builder, iHousing, Residential Developer, Digital Home, and ProSales magazines. For 17 years, he served as the editorial director of Builder magazine, published by Hanley Wood. Builder was named the best business publication in America in 2007 by the American Society of Business Publication Editors. For 12 years, Thompson directed the editorial council at Hanley Wood, at one time one of the 10 largest business publishers in the United States, setting editorial policy for more than 30 business magazines.

Early life

Thompson was born in Bangor, Maine, the son of Boyce Thompson and Patricia Marie Simmers. The family moved to Bronxville, New York, after the elder Thompson finished a stint in the Air Force Reserves. At 10, the family moved to St. Louis, Missouri, where in 1973 Thompson graduated from Clayton High School. Thompson received his bachelor’s degree in English from Northwestern University and a Master’s degree in Journalism from the University of Missouri. While in college, he served as a county government reporter for the Columbia Missourian and as a Washington correspondent for the Coalfield Progress (Norton, Va.) and the Brattleboro Reformer (Vermont).

Early writing career
Early in his professional career, Thompson wrote for a wide variety of publications, including The Washington Post, Governing, Changing Times, Venture, Remodeling, and Practical Homeowner. He served as a Washington correspondent for building and construction titles owned by Reed Elsevier. He worked as a senior editor in the Development Division at Hanley Wood, launching new business magazines such as Building Products, Custom Home, and Kitchen and Bath.

Books
Thompson’s book, Designing for Disaster (Schiffer 2019), outlines techniques to build and design homes to withstand the growing, largely unheeded threat of natural disasters. Few new homes in the United States are built to withstand the impact of tornadoes, landslides, hurricanes, earthquakes, and fires. Building codes provide scant protection in only a few cities where major storms have claimed lives. "For the most part, it's the Wild West," Thompson told Fast Company. The problem is systematic rather than technological, Thompson said. Most of the engineering needed to protect homes has been done. Designing for Disaster received a gold award in the architectural category from the Independent Book Publishers Association.

In Anatomy of a Great Home (Schiffer 2018), Thompson demystifies, the best practices of award-winning residential architecture, using common language rather than rarefied architectural prose. The book, in its second printing, profiles more than 50 award-winning residential projects with goal of improving residential architecture in the United States.

The New New Home (Taunton Press 2014), chronicles innovations employed by builders and architects to survive the great housing recession of the early 21st Century. His premise, according to a review in the Chicago Tribune, was to inform homeowners how they could protect the value of their home in the event of another downturn by buying the most energy-efficient, green home without "bloated" space. Thompson speculated that builders would remove these best practices from homes to save money once the housing recession ended. The New New Home was named book of the year by the National Association of Real Estate Editors.

The Forever Home (Schiffer 2022), is based on interviews with more than 50 new-home owners and architects during the pandemic. It highlights methods for producing homes without built-in obsolescence. It includes profiles of homes with flexible floor plans, long-lasting materials, and built-in defenses against extreme weather.

Magazine editing
As editor of Builder magazine, the leading periodical for one of the biggest industries in the United States, Thompson regularly challenged the industry to build more efficiently, to use more authentic and flexible designs, and to leave a softer environmental footprint. The July 2008 issue of Builder, cited in scholarly works, was devoted entirely to the issue of sprawl. The magazine's August 2006 cover story, "Line in the Sand," highlighted the industry's growing reliance on undocumented workers. At the time, illegal immigrants accounted for one in seven construction workers, fueling the industry's rapid, profitable growth. Other cover stories highlighted the industry's penchant for building impractical McMansions, and the movement in the 1990s toward urban infill construction.

Research 
Thompson regularly commissioned consumer research that challenged builder conceptions. One survey of 1,509 home buyers conducted in 2003 with Harvard's Joint Center for Housing Studies, found that resales are a bigger competitive threat than most builders imagine. It found that most new home buyers compared them to resales. Builders, Thompson told the Washington Post, believe they are competing against each other. Instead, they need to do a better job standing out from resales.

A survey of 700 would-be home buyers commissioned when the housing market started to weaken in 2007 questioned whether the American Dream of home ownership was still alive. It found that "people want smaller homes, they want way more value for the money, and they want a house that is nearly a perfect lifestyle fit," Thompson told the Chicago Tribune.

Americans are downsizing because they have lost a ton of equity, Thompson told The Standard Times in 2011. Demographic forces are also contributing to the trend, he said; one-third of American home buyers are single, and people are marrying later. A frequent critic of oversized homes, Thompson was quoted in Leigh Gallagher's, “The End of the Suburbs: Where the American Dream is Moving.” “Gone are the master bathrooms you can land planes in,” he said.

Show homes 
As editor of Builder, Thompson hired prominent architects and builders to build a series of more than 12 concept homes. The Home of the Future (1997), designed by architect Barry Berkus, featured his-and-her work spaces of equal size and movable walls that could be adjusted depending on how the home was to be used. The home was heated and cooled with a geothermal system of wells dug in the yard. Electricity was collected in photovoltaic panels roof designed to blend in with roof shingles. The photovoltaic shingles powered a prototype electric car that occupied a garage designed for indoor basketball. Most newspapers applauded the home's forward-looking ideas but criticized its architecture. The Orlando Sentinel called it a "big, brooding Medieval-looking affair." A critic for the Dallas Morning News called it "appalling ... with three faux-stone towers from which residents can pour boiling oil solicitors and truculent neighbors."

Thompson worked with DPZ and Beazer Homes to build a series of three live-work buildings in a slaughterhouse community in downtown Atlanta for the 2001 International Builders Show. Andres Duany developed the prototypes by walking downtown districts in small American cities. The affordable homes were intended for use by the owners of small firms—real estate brokerages, insurance salespeople, graphic artists. At the time, Atlanta was suffering from some of the worst sprawl in the United States. "People don't want long commutes anymore," Thompson told the Tampa Bay Times.

Thompson worked with Martha Stewart and KB Home to design a prototype green home for the 2011 International Builders Show. Katherine Salant of the Washington Post called the $380,000 home "an unusually successful melding of green construction, tasteful design, and moderate size and expense." Builders at the time were having difficulty marketing green homes. The show home included a composting kitchen that supplied a herb garden, large windows and patio doors that filled the main rooms with sunlight, and energy-conserving technology such as motion-sensitive on-demand hot water, an insulated attic, and photovoltaic panels. The Columbus Dispatch called it "radical" in two respects: it produces all the energy it consumes and it's affordable.

The 2004 Ultimate Family home, one of the first net-zero homes built in the United States, featured a radiant barrier roof panel, fluorescent lights, sealed ductwork, solar panels, solar hot water heaters. It was the subject of a Department of Energy case study. The home's design, based on focus group research with families, including children, featured a rotunda kitchen that served as a home management area, an oversized garage with an air conditioned workshop, and observatory that could convert from a game room to a sleeping porch.

Thompson worked with Fleetwood, Devereaux Associates, and Ron Mace of North Carolina State University to design the Lifestages House, a manufactured home built with universal design. The home's accessible features included a roll-in shower; a raised dishwasher and lowered microwave; faucets that could be operated from a seated position; and a caretaker suite with an intercom link to the master bedroom suite. Universally designed housing "has rarely looked this good," wrote an architecture critic for the Washington Post.

The Home Link homes was built with advanced framing techniques largely ignored by home builders. The home employed open headers above doors and windows and open corners that allowed for more fiberglass insulation to be installed in wall cavities. The heating and air conditioning system was smaller than typically installed in a home this size. The air handling system cleaned outdoor air and captured heat from vented air. An updated floor plan provided rooms that could be used for multiple purposes and was long on storage and drop-off space.

In 2010, Thompson worked with Marriane Cusato to design A Home for the New Economy, a virtual show home that demonstrated long-term economical, space-efficient living. The New York Times Magazine called it an "exercise in speculation;" it questioned whether Americans would "re-evaluate cultural assumptions that equate ever-larger houses with success and stability." Major living spaces within the house could be rearranged depending on a family's lifestyle needs—bedrooms converted to work spaces, offices turned into accessory apartments, owner's suites expanded with nanny suites. Versions of the home were built in several cities.

Appearances and commentary
From 2015 through 2020, during the explosion of new internet products for the home, Thompson curated an exhibit of cutting-edge home products – most of them sustainable—which he took to as many as a dozen home homes each year. Through television appearances, speeches, and live product demonstrations, he highlighted prototype products that later became mainstays, including smart thermostats, video doorbells, motion-controlled lighting, home robots, and a variety of products made with recycled content.

Thompson has appeared on HGTV, the Discovery Channel, and numerous local TV stations. He is frequently quoted in major newspapers about housing and technology trends, including major newspapers such as the Chicago Tribune, The Wall Street Journal, The Washington Post, and The New York Times.

Charitable giving
At a time of record profitability in home building, Thompson worked with a private equity firm to create the first major program of charitable giving in the home building industry, The Hearthstone Builder Humanitarian Award. The program, which recognizes builders each year for their charitable endeavors, has raised more than $7 million that has gone into philanthropic causes ranging from homeless shelters to boys and girls clubs. Thompson served on the board of directors of HomeAid, an organization that builds temporary shelters, multi-denominational Catholics for Housing, which develops workforce housing, and the editorial committee of American Business Media.

Awards
In 2008, Thompson a lifetime achievement award, the Crain Award, from American Business Media for a distinguished career in business magazine publishing. In 2010, he was inducted into the Editorial Hall of Fame by min magazine, a magazine for publication professionals.

Personal life
His great grandfather, J.E. Thompson, built the Rancho Joaquina House, a celebrated Spanish Colonial Home in Scottsdale, Arizona. Thompson’s grandfather, William Boner Thompson, served the CEO of The Vinnell Corporation, a private military contractor. Thompson’s great uncle, William Boyce Thompson, a financier and miner, founded the Newmont, the world's largest gold-mining company. His great grandfather, William Thompson, served as mayor of Butte, Montana, was elected to the Montana state legislature, and owned one of the largest lumberyard chains in the West.

Selected works 
 Designing for Disaster (Schiffer 2019)
 Anatomy of a Great Home (Schiffer 2018)
 The New New Home (Taunton 2014)
 The Forever Home (Schiffer 2022)

References

External links 
 Author's Website
 Columns at Builder magazine
 Quoted in The End of the Suburbs: Where the American Dream is Moving
 A Look Inside the New New Home

1955 births
Writers from Bangor, Maine
Writers from St. Louis
Northwestern University alumni
Missouri School of Journalism alumni
American architecture writers
American magazine editors
Living people